Maytenus crassipes is a species of plant in the family Celastraceae. It is endemic to Jamaica.

References

crassipes
Endemic flora of Jamaica
Taxonomy articles created by Polbot
Taxobox binomials not recognized by IUCN